Alexander Müller (born 17 July 1969) is a German politician of the Free Democratic Party (FDP). Since 2017, he has served as a member of the Bundestag.

Early life and education 
Müller graduated 1988 from the Bischöfliche Gymnasium in Koblenz and, studied Informatics engineering.

Political career 
Müller joined the Young Liberals and the FDP in 1990. He has been described as libertarian.

In 2017 Müller became a Member of the German parliament (Bundestag). Since the 2021 elections, he has been serving as his parliamentary group's spokesperson for military procurement.

In addition to his committee assignments, Müller served as deputy chair of the German-Polish Parliamentary Friendship Group from 2018 to 2021.

References

External links 
 Biographie at Deutscher Bundestag, October 2019.
 Speeches in parliament of Alexander Müller, retrieved 2 February 2020.

1969 births
21st-century German politicians
Members of the Bundestag for Hesse
Living people
Members of the Bundestag for the Free Democratic Party (Germany)
Members of the Bundestag 2017–2021
Members of the Bundestag 2021–2025